Rot (German for Red) is the fifth studio album by German rapper Sabrina Setlur, released by 3p Records on 24 August 2007. It was entirely co-produced by Martin Haas and Moses Pelham, with additional contribution by Bayz Benzon. The album was critically acclaimed, but widely failed to receive any commercial success yet, becoming Setlur's lowest-charting studio album to date.

Track listing

Credits and personnel

 Amir Amjee Azar — vocals
 Bayz Benzon — keyboard
 Karl Hass — vocals
 Martin Haas — keyboard, vocals
 Sebastian Hämer — vocals
 Kaye-Ree — vocals
 Kaygin — vocals

 Julia Liebe — vocals
 Alli Neander — guitar
 Charles Simmons — vocals
 Miriam Skroban — vocals
 Dominik Stegmüller — vocals
 Bergitta Victor — vocals

Production
 Concept: M. Pelham, S. Setlur
 Product coordination: M. Pelham
 Product communication: Liesa Bartolome, Alex Besparis, Melanie Buddenhagen, Gwen-Marie Eigenweill, Sascha Ewert, Christian Ficke, Hasan Günay, Felix Heiden, Luise Kemmner, Julia Martin, Markus Onyuru, M. Pelham, S. Setlur, Yvonne Setlur
 Business affairs & legal: Dr. Udo Kornmeier, Andreas Walter
 Mastering: Chris Athens (at Sterling Studios in New York City, New York, United States)
 Songbook: G. Eigenweill, S. Ewert, M. Pelham, Jens Wurche
 Logo & Artwork: H. Günay, M. Pelham
 Photography: Katja Kuhl

Charts

References

2007 albums
Sabrina Setlur albums